Timothy Logan Bakewell Davis (born April 18, 1951) was an American writer who worked in Hollywood from the mid-1970s until his death March 1, 2016, in Los Angeles, California. He was perhaps best known for having been the son of wealthy American expatriates in Spain who lavishly entertained celebrities and the literati, including Ernest Hemingway in a famous 1959 visit.

Early life and education
The elder of two children, Teo Davis was born in Paris. His father, William Nathan Davis, of London and Madrid, was “a wealthy patron of the arts from Indianapolis and a graduate of Yale (1929)," according to a Hemingway signed letter to Davis dated March 31, 1942 and listed in a December 2013 Christie’s auction. His mother, Anne Bakewell Davis of Baltimore, was a distant descendant of John James Audubon, the French-born ornithologist, naturalist, and painter.

Davis grew up on the family's historic villa filled with Jackson Pollock paintings called La Cónsula in Málaga. It was the birthplace of artist Pablo Picasso on the coast of southern Spain. His younger sister Nena and he lived in a world of famous adults whom their parents often entertained. In 1959, the guests included Ernest Hemingway and his fourth wife Mary Welsh Hemingway.

Hemingway was in Spain to write a series of articles for LIFE magazine about that summer's bullfighting duel between the world's two leading matadors at the time, Antonio Ordóñez and his brother-in-law Luis Miguel Dominguín. During that summer, eight-year-old Teo befriended the famed author staying at his home. The story of their friendship and of Davis' own tragic self-destructiveness in life was later told in the book Looking for Hemingway; Spain, The Bullfights and a Final Rite of Passage (Rowman & Littlefield, 2016). 

When he was thirteen, Teo Davis left Spain to attend West Downs School in Winchester, Hampshire, and then Eton College in Windsor, England, from which he graduated in 1970. Then came a major disappointment in the 18-year-old's life: he failed to gain acceptance into the University of Oxford when other friends were admitted. Instead, Davis soon headed to America.

Career

In 1973, at the age of 21, Davis arrived in Texas, where he soon took a position as a general assignments reporter for the state's largest newspaper, the Houston Chronicle. Davis had no reporting experience but he had an important Texas connection who arranged the job: Barefoot Sanders, former counsel to President Lyndon B. Johnson. The following year he moved to California, where he became a partner in a small film‐production company. He never had a screenplay produced, and his only professional credit in the industry was as an "additional photographer" in the 1977 British film Long Shot.

Addiction
Davis's addiction to cocaine, heroin, crystal meth and other drugs became apparent to his friends in the mid-1980s and worsened over the years. There were several arrests for possession that friends and family helped him reduce in the California criminal justice system to alternative drug diversion counseling and rehabilitation programs.

Personal life
Teo Davis married Diana Radway, daughter of the Marchioness of Linlithgow of London and the late John S. Radway of New York, in January 1980 in Chelsea, London.Diana Radway was a graduate of Columbia University. Their engagement was announced in The New York Times. They divorced in 1981. Teo Davis died March 1, 2016.

External Links 
 The Story about Teo Davis and Ernest Hemingway
 Memorial to Teo Davis

References 

Writers from Los Angeles
People educated at Eton College
1951 births
2016 deaths
Writers from London